Periodic Detention Centre (Symonston) is a minimum security Australian prison located in Symonston, Australian Capital Territory, Australia. Its current capacity is 22 when in use. It was formerly the Quamby Children's Remand Centre.

Quamby
The Quamby Youth Detention Centre originally opened in 1962 and was used as a shelter for young people who had nowhere to reside, or for young people who were placed on short term remand. Those who received a committal term from the courts were housed at New South Wales training centres.

Quamby, a medium to low security facility, can accommodate up to 26 children and young people who have been refused bail or sentenced to a period of detention. The Children’s Court may pass a sentence of up to two years. However, a longer sentence may be handed down if the child or young person is sentenced through the Supreme Court.

The age of criminal responsibility in the ACT is 10 years. Quamby can house both male and females from the age of 10. As a person who committed their offence whilst under 18 may be sentenced as a young person up to the age of 18 and 6 months, it is possible for Quamby to house a detainee over the age of 18 for the duration of their Court Order.

Quamby operates within the legislative requirements of the Children and Young People Act 1999, and is operated by the Office of Children, Youth and Family Services in the ACT Department of Disability, Housing and Community Services.

Shifting to new youth premises
In early 2006, the Government of the Australian Capital Territory announced plans for a $40 million youth detention centre at Mitchell, ACT. Thirty hectares of pastoral land on Wells Station Road, just off the Federal Highway, were earmarked for a new centre to replace the existing Quamby centre. The new juvenile detention centre opened in June 2008 as Bimberi Youth Justice Centre, and is capable of housing up to 50 residents.

In 2007 Symonston was criticised by the Human Rights Commission for allowing little time out of cells and for excessive lockdowns.

See also 
 List of Australian prisons

References

Prisons in the Australian Capital Territory
1962 establishments in Australia